His Majesty's Advocate, known as the Lord Advocate, is the chief legal officer of the Scottish Government and the Crown in Scotland for both civil and criminal matters that fall within the devolved powers of the Scottish Parliament. They are the chief public prosecutor for Scotland and all prosecutions on indictment are conducted by the Crown Office and Procurator Fiscal Service in the Lord Advocate's name on behalf of the Monarch.

The officeholder is one of the Great Officers of State of Scotland. The current Lord Advocate is Dorothy Bain KC, who was nominated by First Minister Nicola Sturgeon in June 2021.

History
The office of Advocate to the monarch is an ancient one. The first recognised Lord Advocate was esteemed legal scholar and philosopher Sir Ross Grimley of Goldenacre, recorded in 1483 as serving King James III. At this time the post was generally called the King's Advocate and only in the year 1573 was the term "Lord Advocate" first used.

From 1707 to 1998, the Lord Advocate was the chief legal adviser of the British Government and the Crown on Scottish legal matters, both civil and criminal, until the Scotland Act 1998 devolved most domestic affairs to the Scottish Parliament. His Majesty's Government is now advised on Scots law by the Advocate General for Scotland.

The Lord Advocate is not head of the Faculty of Advocates; that position is held by the Dean of the Faculty of Advocates.

Parliamentary and government role

Until devolution in 1999, all lord advocates were, by convention, members of the United Kingdom government, although the post was not normally in the Cabinet. Since devolution, the Lord Advocate has been an automatically ex officio member of the Scottish Government.

From 1999 until 2007, the Lord Advocate attended the weekly Scottish Cabinet meetings. However, after the 2007 election, the new First Minister Alex Salmond decided that Lord Advocate would no longer attend the Scottish Cabinet, stating he wished to "de-politicise" the post.

Until devolution, all lord advocates were, by convention, members of either the House of Commons or the House of Lords to allow them to speak for the government. Those who were not already members of either house received a life peerage on appointment. Since devolution, the Lord Advocate and the Solicitor General for Scotland are permitted to attend and speak in the Scottish Parliament ex officio, even if they are not Members of the Scottish Parliament.

Future careers of lord advocates

Appointments as Senators of the College of Justice were formerly made on the nomination of the Lord Advocate. Every Lord Advocate between 1842 and 1967 was later appointed to the bench, either on demitting office or at a later date. Many lord advocates in fact nominated themselves for appointment as Lord President of the Court of Session or as Lord Justice Clerk.

Crown Office and Procurator Fiscal Service
The Crown Office and Procurator Fiscal Service is headed by the Lord Advocate and the Solicitor General for Scotland, and is the public prosecution service in Scotland. It also carries out functions which are broadly equivalent to the coroner in common law jurisdictions. Incorporated within the Crown Office is the Legal Secretariat to the Lord Advocate.

Crown Agent
The Crown Agent is the principal legal advisor to the Lord Advocate on prosecution matters. He or she also acts as Chief Executive for the department and as solicitor in all legal proceedings in which the Lord Advocate appears as representing his or her own department. They issue general instructions for the guidance of Crown counsel, procurators fiscal, sheriff clerks and other public officials; transmits instructions from Crown counsel to procurators fiscal about prosecutions; and in consultation with the Clerk of Justiciary, arranges sittings of the High Court of Justiciary. At trials in the High Court in Edinburgh, they attend as instructing solicitor. They are assisted by other senior legal, managerial and administrative staff.

The Crown Agent also holds the office of King's and Lord Treasurer's Remembrancer.

Calls for reform

In the Greshornish House Accord of 16 September 2008, Professors Hans Köchler and Robert Black said—

It is inappropriate that the Chief Legal Adviser to the Government is also head of all criminal prosecutions. Whilst the Lord Advocate and Solicitor General continue as public prosecutors the principle of separation of powers seems compromised. The potential for a conflict of interest always exists. Resolution of these circumstances would entail an amendment of the provisions contained within the Scotland Act 1998.

The judges of Scotland's highest court came to share this view. In a submission to the commission set up to consider how the devolution settlement between Scotland and the United Kingdom could be improved, the judges recommended that the Lord Advocate should cease to be the head of the public prosecution system and should act only as the Scottish Government's chief legal adviser. They noted various ways in which the Lord Advocate's roles had caused problems for the judicial system, including the ability "to challenge... virtually any act of a prosecutor has led to a plethora of disputed issues, with consequential delays to the holding of trials and to the hearing and completion of appeals against conviction." The judges proposed three alternative solutions: stripping the Lord Advocate of responsibility for prosecutions, exempting the Lord Advocate from compliance with the European Convention on Human Rights, or changing the law on criminal appeals. While not specifically favouring any of the three, they noted that the third proposal was radical enough to "generate considerable controversy".

List of lords advocate

Pre-Union 

 1478 or earlier–1494: John Ross of Montgrenan
 1494–1503: James Henryson of Fordell
 1503–1521?: Richard Lawson of Heirigs
 1521–1525: James Wishart of Pittarrow
 1525–1527: Adam Otterburn of Reidhall
 1527–1533: John Foulis and Adam Otterburn of Reidhall
 1533–1538: Adam Otterburn and Henry Lauder
 1538–1561: Henry Lauder
Henry Balnaves, to Mary, Queen of Scots
Thomas Cumin, Lord of Session
1561: John Spens of Condie, Lord Condie
Robert Crichton
1573–1582: David Borthwick of Lochhill
 1582–1589: David Macgill of Cranston-Riddell, and Nisbet
 1589–1594: John Skene
 1594: William Hart of Livelands
 1594–1595: Andrew Logie
 1595: Sir Thomas Hamilton and David Macgill
 1596–1612: Sir Thomas Hamilton
 1612–1626: Sir William Oliphant
 1626–1645: Sir Thomas Hope, Bt
 1646–?: Sir Archibald Johnston
Sir Thomas Nicholson
1659–1661: Sir Archibald Primrose
 1661–1664: Sir John Fletcher
 1664–1677: Sir John Nisbet
 1677–1687: Sir George Mackenzie of Rosehaugh
 1687–1688: John Dalrymple
 1688–1689: Sir George Mackenzie
 1689–1692: John Dalrymple
 1692–1707: Sir James Stewart

Post-Union 

 1707–1709: Sir James Stewart 
 1709–1711: Sir David Dalrymple, 1st Baronet
 1711–1713: Sir James Stewart (second time)
 1714: Thomas Kennedy of Dunure
 1714–1720: Sir David Dalrymple, 1st Baronet
 1720–1725: Robert Dundas the elder
 1725–1737: Duncan Forbes
 1737–1742: Charles Erskine
 1742–1746: Robert Craigie
 1746–1754: William Grant
 1754–1760: Robert Dundas the younger
 1760–1766: Thomas Miller
 1766–1775: James Montgomery
 1775–1783: Henry Dundas
 1783: Hon. Henry Erskine
 1783–1789: Ilay Campbell
 1789–1801: Robert Dundas
 1801–1804: Charles Hope
 1804–1806: Sir James Montgomery, Bt
 1806–1807: Hon. Henry Erskine
 1807–1816: Archibald Colquhoun
 1816–1819: Alexander Maconochie
 1819–1830: Sir William Rae
 December 1830 – May 1834: Francis Jeffrey
 May – November 1834: John Murray
 December 1834 – April 1835: Sir William Rae
 April 1835 – April 1839: John Murray
 April 1839 – September 1841: Andrew Rutherfurd
 September 1841 – October 1842: Sir William Rae
 October 1842 – July 1846: Duncan McNeill
 July 1846 – April 1851: Andrew Rutherfurd
 April 1851 – February 1852: James Moncreiff
 February – May 1852: Adam Anderson
 May – December 1852: John Inglis
 December 1852 – March 1858: James Moncreiff
 March – July 1858: John Inglis
 July 1858 – April 1859: Charles Baillie
 April – June 1859: David Mure
 June 1859 – July 1866: James Moncreiff
 July 1866 – February 1867: George Patton
 February 1867 – December 1868: Edward Strathearn Gordon
 December 1868 – October 1869: James Moncreiff
 October 1869 – February 1874: George Young
 1874–1876: Edward Strathearn Gordon
 July 1876 – April 1880: William Watson
 May 1880 – August 1881: John McLaren
 August 1881 – July 1885: John Blair Balfour
 July 1885 – February 1886: John Macdonald
 February – August 1886: John Blair Balfour
 August 1886 – October 1888: John Macdonald
 October 1888 – August 1891: James Patrick Bannerman Robertson
 October 1891 – August 1892: Sir Charles John Pearson
 August 1892 – July 1895: John Blair Balfour
 July 1895 – May 1896: Sir Charles John Pearson
 May 1896 – October 1903: Andrew Graham Murray
 October 1903 – December 1905: Charles Scott Dickson
 December 1905 – February 1909: Thomas Shaw
 February 1909 – October 1913: Alexander Ure
 October 1913 – December 1916: Robert Munro
 December 1916 – 1920: James Avon Clyde
 1920–1922: Thomas Brash Morison
 March 1922 – November 1922: Charles David Murray
 November 1922 – February 1924: William Watson
 February 1924 – November 1924: Hugh Pattison MacMillan
 November 1924 – May 1929: William Watson
 May 1929 – June 1929: Alexander Munro MacRobert
 June 1929 – 1933: Craigie Mason Aitchison
 1933–1935: Wilfrid Guild Normand
 April 1935 – October 1935: Douglas Jamieson
 1935–1941: Thomas Mackay Cooper
 1941–1945: James Scott Cumberland Reid
 1945–1947: George Reid Thomson
 1947–1951: John Thomas Wheatley
 1951–1955: James Latham McDiarmid Clyde
 1955–1960: William Rankine Milligan
 1960–1962: William Grant
 1962–1964: Ian Hamilton Shearer
 1964–1967: George Gordon Stott
 1967–1970: Henry Stephen Wilson
 1970–1974: Norman Russell Wylie
 1974–1979: Ronald King Murray
 1979–1984: Lord Mackay of Clashfern
 1984–1989: Lord Cameron of Lochbroom
 1989–1992: Lord Fraser of Carmyllie
 1992–1995: Lord Rodger of Earlsferry
 1995–1997: Lord Mackay of Drumadoon

Post-Devolution

See also

Lord Advocate's Reference
Law Officers of the Crown
Attorney General for England and Wales
Attorney General for Northern Ireland

References

Sources
The career path of recent Scottish law officers, Scots Law Times, 14 July 2006

External links 
 Lord Advocate on the Scottish Government website
 Lord Advocate on the Crown Office and Procurator Fiscal Service website

 
Scots law formal titles
Lists of government ministers of the United Kingdom
Lord Advocate
Lists of office-holders in Scotland
Region-specific legal occupations
Law Officers of the Crown in the United Kingdom